Nihil is the sixth full-length release by Impaled Nazarene. It was released June 16, 2000 through Osmose Productions. Alexi Laiho of Children of Bodom plays guitar on the album. Laiho has also composed songs "Cogito Ergo Sum" and "Zero Tolerance". The album recently entered Germany's Index List which means the album may not be advertised in public or sold to minors. The song "Zero Tolerance" is infamous due to its homophobic lyrics (it's not included in the booklet in some editions).

Track listing
 "Cogito Ergo Sum" – 2:10 (Laiho, Luttinen)
 "Human-Proof" – 4:38 (Kellokoski, Luttinen)
 "Wrath of the Goat" – 1:22 (Kellokoski, Luttinen)
 "Angel Rectums Still Bleed – The Sequel" – 2:42 (Antilla, Luttinen)
 "Post Eclipse Era" – 4:21 (Kellokoski, Luttinen)
 "Nothing Is Sacred" – 2:19 (Kellokoski, Luttinen)
 "Zero Tolerance" – 1:52 (Laiho, Luttinen)
 "Assault the Weak" – 3:49 (Antilla, Kellokoski, Luttinen)
 "How the Laughter Died" – 4:07 (Kellokoski, Luttinen)
 "Nihil" – 4:55 (Luttinen)

Personnel
 Mika Luttinen – vocals
 Jarno Anttila – rhythm guitar
 Alexi Laiho – lead guitar
 Jani Lehtosaari – bass
 Reima Kellokoski – drums

Production
Arranged By Impaled Nazarene
Produced, Recorded, Engineered & Mixed By Anssi Kippo
Mastered By Mika Jussila

2000 albums
Impaled Nazarene albums
Osmose Productions albums
Albums with cover art by Jean-Pascal Fournier